Gumm is a surname. Notable people with the surname include:

Frances Gumm (1922–1969), better known as Judy Garland, American actress, singer, and vaudevillian
James Gumm, Australian explorer
Jay Paul Gumm (born 1963), American politician